Porawagala is a viewing point on top of a hillside overlooking the town of Bandarawela, Sri Lanka.

References

Bandarawela